T.B. Benjamin was an Anglican bishop]: he was the third Bishop of North Kerala. 

Benjamin was ordained in 1937. He was Vicar of the CSI Cathedral, Kozhikode and corporate manager of the CMS schools before his consecration.

References

 Church of South India clergy
 Anglican bishops of North Kerala
1908 births
2009 deaths